This is a summary of 1984 in music in the United Kingdom, including the official charts from that year.

Summary
1984 was a year of several huge selling releases, including at the time the biggest selling single ever. Six singles this year sold over a million copies, the joint highest number ever along with 1998. Out of the top 10 biggest selling songs of the 1980s, six of them all peaked in 1984 including the entire top 4.

One of the biggest bands of the year was Frankie Goes to Hollywood, a five-piece from Liverpool fronted by Holly Johnson. Their debut single "Relax" was banned by the BBC for sexually suggestive content, and was number 1 for five weeks. Their second single "Two Tribes" referenced the ongoing cold war and featured a music video of lookalikes of American president Ronald Reagan and Soviet leader Konstantin Chernenko violently fighting, and was number 1 for nine weeks in the summer, both songs selling over a million. In November they made chart history when their third single, "The Power of Love", also made number 1. They were only the second band in chart history to have their first three releases all go to number 1, following Gerry & The Pacemakers twenty years earlier; however, it would be their last. Their album "Welcome to the Pleasuredome" also reached number 1.

Wham! had their first number 1 single this year after four earlier top 10 hits, the upbeat "Wake Me Up Before You Go Go". This would soon be followed by their second, "Freedom" later in the year, and their second album Make It Big also reached the top. One of the members of the band, George Michael, also released a solo single this year, the ballad "Careless Whisper" co-written by his bandmate Andrew Ridgeley. It was number 1 for three weeks and sold over a million.

A big-selling singer who would go on to have many hits over the next two decades first appeared this year, American singer Madonna. Her debut hit "Holiday" reached number 6, and "Like a Virgin" charted three places higher at number 3. From the same country came Prince, who had his first two top 10 hits with "When Doves Cry" and "Purple Rain". For both artists, 1985 would bring even more hits as would the rest of the decade.

After eighteen years, Stevie Wonder achieved his first solo number 1 single with "I Just Called to Say I Love You", from the soundtrack of the film The Woman in Red, selling over a million. He had first charted at the age of 15 with "Uptight (Everything's Alright)" in 1966, and had previously had a number 1 in 1982 with a duet with Paul McCartney, "Ebony and Ivory". In 1984 his harmonica playing featured in Chaka Khan's number one hit "I Feel for You" and in 1985 Eurythmics' number 1 hit "There Must Be an Angel (Playing with My Heart)".

The Christmas number one single featured more than 40 artists. "Do They Know It's Christmas?", written by Bob Geldof and Midge Ure, was made in response to ongoing famine in Ethiopia, so the supergroup Band Aid was formed to sing a charity record about it, all proceeds from the song going to the charity to raise money for help. Popular acts of the day such as Wham!, U2, Spandau Ballet, Duran Duran and Boy George sung on the record.

Not only did the song become the Christmas number one, it sold over three million copies and became the biggest selling single of all time, a record that held for the next thirteen years. The song at number 2, Wham!'s Last Christmas, sold over a million and proceeds from that also went to the charity. Further Band Aid singles would be released in 1989 (Band Aid II) and 2004 (Band Aid 20), both also Christmas number one.

Events
 9 January – first complete performance of Oliver Knussen's Where the Wild Things Are by Glyndebourne Touring Opera at the National Theatre, London.
 11 January – BBC Radio 1 DJ Mike Read announces on air that he will not play the single "Relax" by Frankie Goes to Hollywood because of its suggestive lyrics.  The BBC places a total ban on the record at about the same time.
 21 January – "Relax" reaches number one in the UK singles chart, despite the BBC ban; it will spend a total of 42 weeks in the Top 40.
 14 February – Elton John marries studio engineer Renate Blauel.
 1 March – Sting plays his last concerts with The Police at the end of the Synchronicity tour; the band takes a "pause" after the tour and only play a few special events together after this, until 2007, when they would organize a reunion tour.
 1 May – Mick Fleetwood files for bankruptcy in the United States.
 5 August – Now 3 becomes the 300th album to reach number one on the UK Albums Chart.
 23 October – A report on the Ethiopian famine by BBC journalist Michael Buerk is broadcast in the UK and receives an unprecedented public response.  Among those watching is Bob Geldof, who is inspired to release a charity record to raise money to help with famine relief.
 25 November – The Band Aid single "Do They Know It's Christmas?" is recorded at SARM Studios in Notting Hill, London, by a gathering of performers that includes Paul Young, Simon Le Bon, Bono, Phil Collins, Paul Weller, Sting, Boy George and Tony Hadley.
 28 November – The Bring Me Sunshine charity concert at the London Palladium, in memory of Eric Morecambe, includes musical performances by Kenny Ball & His Jazzmen, Des O'Connor and Ernie Wise.
 2 December – Frankie Goes to Hollywood become the first act to take their first three singles to the UK #1 position since Gerry & The Pacemakers in 1963, when "The Power of Love" tops the chart.
 3 December – Bob Geldof and Band Aid release the single "Do They Know It's Christmas", which becomes the fastest-selling single of all time in the UK.
 11 December – While on tour, Bucks Fizz's tour bus crashes. All members of the group are injured and member Mike Nolan suffers brain damage after falling into a coma.
 13 December – George Harrison makes a rare public appearance, joining Deep Purple on stage in Sydney, Australia for their encore rendition of "Lucille".

Charts

Number one singles

Number one albums

Year-end charts

Best-selling singles

Best-selling albums

Notes:

Classical music: new works
 Jonathan Harvey – Come, Holy Ghost
 Alun Hoddinott –  String Quartet No. 2, Op. 113
 Robin Holloway – Viola Concerto, Op. 56
 Elizabeth Maconchy – String Quartet No. 13, Quartetto Corto

Musical theatre
 Mike Batt – The Hunting of the Snark given its first performance in the Barbican with the composer conducting the London Symphony Orchestra.
 Howard Goodall – The Hired Man

Musical films
 Give My Regards to Broad Street, with Paul McCartney

Births
 17 January – Calvin Harris, singer-songwriter, record producer, DJ
 25 February – Lovefoxxx, singer (CSS)
 7 March - Kevin McDaid, singer (V)
 27 March – Laura Critchley singer-songwriter
 7 April - Yonah Higgins, singer (Cleopatra)
 22 April – Amelle Berrabah, singer (Sugababes)
 4 May – Victoria Hesketh (Little Boots), singer-songwriter, musician, DJ
 10 May – Kristyna Myles, singer-songwriter and pianist
 14 May – Olly Murs, singer-songwriter
 23 June – Duffy, singer
 12 July – Gareth Gates, singer
 23 July – Matthew Murphy, singer and guitarist (The Wombats)
 16 September – Katie Melua, singer and musician
 22 September – Ross Jarman, musician (The Cribs)
 26 September – Keisha Buchanan, singer, (Sugababes)
 16 October – Shayne Ward, singer
 27 October – Kelly Osbourne, singer and TV personality
 25 December – Jessica Origliasso and Lisa Origliasso, singers (The Veronicas)

Deaths
 1 January – Alexis Korner, blues musician, 55 (lung cancer)
 10 January – Binnie Hale, actress and singer, 84
 26 January – Grahame Clifford, singer and actor, 78
 3 March – Kathleen Richards, musicologist, pianist and composer, 88
 9 March – Imogen Holst, conductor and composer, 76
 6 April – Jimmy Kennedy, Irish-born British songwriter, 81
 8 June – Gordon Jacob, composer, 89
 21 June – Webster Booth, tenor, 82
 22 June – Dill Jones, jazz pianist, 60
 July – Gervase Hughes, composer, 78
 14 August – Peter Wishart, composer, 63
 3 September – Dora Labbette, operatic soprano, 86
 25 October – Stanford Robinson, conductor and composer, 80
 5 November – Jessie Furze, pianist and composer, 81
 9 December – Ivor Moreton, singer, pianist and composer, 76
 date unknown – Arthur Fear, operatic bass-baritone

Music awards

BRIT Awards
The 1984 BRIT Awards winners were:
 Best British producer: Steve Levine
 Best classical recording: Kiri Te Kanawa – "Songs of the Auvergne"
 Best international artist: Michael Jackson
 British breakthrough act: Paul Young
 British female solo artist: Annie Lennox
 British group: Culture Club
 British male solo artist: David Bowie
 Best Selling Single: Culture Club – "Karma Chameleon"
 Outstanding contribution: George Martin
 The Sony award for technical excellence: Spandau Ballet

See also
 1984 in British radio
 1984 in British television
 1984 in the United Kingdom
 List of British films of 1984

References

External links
 BBC Radio 1's Chart Show
 The Official Charts Company

 
British music
British music by year